Brandon Fleming was a British playwright and screenwriter. He co-wrote the 1925 stage melodrama None But the Brave with Bernard Merivale.

Partial filmography
 The Eleventh Commandment (1924)
 Mayfair Girl (1933)
 Great Stuff (1933)
 Forging Ahead (1933)
 The Flaw (1933)
 If I Were Rich (1936)
 Melody of My Heart (1936)
 Such Is Life (1936)
 All In (1936)
 There's Always a Thursday (1957)
 The Bank Raiders (1958)
 Dangerous Afternoon (1961)

Selected plays
 The Eleventh Commandment (1921)
 None But the Brave (1925)

References

Bibliography
 Kabatchnik,Amnon. Blood on the Stage, 1925-1950: Milestone Plays of Crime, Mystery, and Detection. Scarecrow Press, 2010.

External links
 
 

Year of birth unknown
Year of death unknown
British male screenwriters
British writers